Dardeh is a village in Asara Rural District, Asara District, Karaj County, Alborz Province, Iran. At the 2006 census, its population was 227, in 74 families.

References 

Populated places in Karaj County